The Cabinet of Syria (Arabic: مجلس وزراء سوريا, majlis wuzara' suria) or Council of Ministers is the chief executive body of the Syrian Arab Republic.

Cabinet in Constitution
According to the Constitution of Syria:

Appointment, powers and removal
Appointment:
Appointed by the President

Powers:
Implementing state public policy
Enforcing laws
Supervising government bodies
Passing administrative decisions
Advising the President

Removal:
Upon dismissal by the President
Upon submission of resignation to the President
Upon removal or resignation of the President
Upon a vote of no-confidence by the legislature

Current cabinet

President Bashar al-Assad accepted the entire cabinet's resignation after a meeting on 29 March 2011. Al-Assad then appointed outgoing Prime Minister Muhammad Naji al-Otari to continue as caretaker prime minister until a new government is appointed. On 3 April 2011, Assad appointed Minister of Agriculture Adel Safar the new Prime Minister. On 6 April 2011, the state-run al-Ekhbariya TV channel said that Foreign Minister Walid al-Moallem, Minister of Defense Dawoud Rajiha, Minister of Endowment and Religious Affairs Mohammed Abdul-Sattar Al Sayed, and Minister of Presidential Palace Affairs Mansour Fadlallah Azzam would remain in the new cabinet. On 9 April 2011, DayPress News reported the new cabinet was expected to be announced in the next week. On 14 April 2011, a new cabinet was officially announced.

On 9 February 2013, president Assad changed seven ministers in the cabinet. The cabinet reshuffle included the ministries of oil, finance, social affairs, labour, housing, public works and agriculture.

In July 2016 president Assad issued Decree no. 203 for 2016 which listed the new Syrian government.

A new government was formed in 2021 under Hussein Arnous.

See also
 Second Mustafa Mero government (2001–2003)
 Muhammad Naji al-Otari government (2003–2011)
 Adel Safar government (2011–12)
 Riyad Hijab government (2012)
 First Wael al-Halqi government (2012–2014)
 Second Wael al-Halqi government (2014–2016)
 Imad Khamis government (2016–2020)
First Arnous government (2020–2021)
Second Arnous government (2021–present)

References

External links
YourOpinion.gov.sy official e-government website
The Syrian Government, SANA, Webarchive site as of 24 May 2011

Council
Syria
 
Cabinet of Syria